Šárka Svobodná (born 1988) is a Czech orienteering competitor.

She received a silver medal in sprint and finished 8th in the middle distance at the Junior World Orienteering Championships in Dubbo in 2007. She finished 5th in the relay with the Czech relay team.

She finished 4th in the sprint at the 2008 junior world championships, 4.4 seconds behind the winner.

Sports career

Location on MS and ME

Location on Championship

See also 
 Czech orienteers
 List of orienteers
 List of orienteering events

References

External links
 

1988 births
Living people
Czech orienteers
Female orienteers
Foot orienteers
Junior World Orienteering Championships medalists